Coloring Book is the third mixtape by American rapper Chance the Rapper. It was produced by his group The Social Experiment, Lido, and Kaytranada, among others. For the mixtape, Chance also collaborated with musicians such as Kanye West, Young Thug, Francis and the Lights, Justin Bieber, 2 Chainz, Kirk Franklin, and the Chicago Children's Choir.

Coloring Book was released on May 13, 2016, exclusively on Apple Music, before being made available to other streaming services on May 27. It was the first mixtape to chart on the US Billboard 200 solely on streams, peaking at number eight, while receiving widespread acclaim from critics who praised its fusion of hip hop and gospel sounds. The mixtape won Best Rap Album at the 2017 Grammy Awards. It was also the first streaming-only album ever to win a Grammy.

Writing and recording
After releasing the well-received mixtape Acid Rap in 2013, Chance the Rapper went on tour with Macklemore & Ryan Lewis. He subsequently relocated to Los Angeles from his hometown of Chicago that December. He rented a North Hollywood mansion, which he dubbed the Koi Kastle. While he worked on music in fits and starts, he mainly spent time socializing with friends he made—among them Frank Ocean and J. Cole. He also abused drugs, mainly Xanax: "I was Xanned out every fucking day," he told GQ in 2016. He also went through numerous relationships, and he began to feel unproductive and empty.

He returned to Chicago and got back together with an old girlfriend. He grew more religious upon learning she was pregnant, and especially so after learning his daughter had an atrial flutter. "I think it was the baby that, you know, brought my faith back," he remarked later. On the subject of her heart condition, he said, "[It] made me pray a whole lot, you know, and need a lot of angels and just see shit in a very, like, direct way." His daughter was born in September 2015. During this time, he began to mull over themes he wished to include in his next mixtape, including "God, love, Chicago, [and] dance." Before working on that, he contributed heavily to Kanye West's album The Life of Pablo. Coloring Book was mainly recorded between March and April 2016. He rented out a room at a Chicago studio, and then another as he needed more space. He gradually came to more or less live at the studio during recording: "Eventually we decided to rent out the whole studio, and we just put mattresses in all the rooms and it became a camp." His method of making the mixtape was inspired by West taking over an entire studio to make Pablo.

Music and lyrics 
Chance the Rapper told Complex that Coloring Book would be a superior record to Surf, the 2015 album that he had released with his group Donnie Trumpet & The Social Experiment. As with his other mixtapes, 10 Day and Acid Rap, the cover artwork was painted by Chicago-based artist Brandon Breaux, who depicted Chance holding his baby daughter (below the frame) in order to capture the expression on his face.

According to Financial Times music critic Ludovic Hunter-Tilney, Coloring Book is an upbeat gospel rap album whose themes of spiritual fulfillment and worldly accomplishment are explored in music "that places gospel choirs and jazzy horns in a modern setting of Auto-Tuned hooks and crisp beats". Rolling Stones Christopher R. Weingarten wrote that the gospel choirs were the foundation of the mixtape's music, functioning in the same way disco interpolations had on the earliest rap records, James Brown rhythms had for Public Enemy, and soul samples had for Kanye West.

Chance discussed Coloring Books theme of Christian faith in an interview with Zane Lowe. "I never really set out to make anything that could pretend to be new gospel or pretend to be the gospel", he said. "It's just music from me as a Christian man because I think before I was making music as a Christian child. And in both cases I have imperfections, but there was a declaration that can be made through going all the [stuff] I've been through the last few years." Lowe himself believed the mixtape showcased how "faith in music and faith in God go hand-in-hand a lot of times".

Marketing and sales 
Coloring Books release date was revealed by Tonight Show host Jimmy Fallon after Chance's May 6 performance of "Blessings" on the show. The mixtape was released exclusively to the Apple Music streaming service at 11 p.m. EST on May 12, the same day its second single "No Problem" was released; the lead single "Angels" had been released on October 27, 2015, while its finale single "Summer Friends" was released on August 17, 2016. Coloring Book was leaked to DatPiff, a mixtape distribution website, one hour after its release; it was removed from the site the following day.

In the first week of release, Coloring Book debuted at number eight on the US Billboard 200 based on 57.3 million streams of its songs, which Billboard equated to 38,000 album units. It was the first release to chart on the Billboard 200 solely on streams. The mixtape was available only on Apple Music through May 27, when it was released to other streaming services. Coloring Book became the first to surpass 500,000 with only streaming album equivalents. Since its debut in May, the album has stayed on the Billboard 200 chart for 33 consecutive weeks, peaking at number eight.

Critical reception 

Coloring Book was met with widespread critical acclaim. At Metacritic, which assigns a normalized rating out of 100 to reviews from mainstream publications, the mixtape received an average score of 89, based on 21 reviews. Aggregator AnyDecentMusic? gave it 8.2 out of 10, based on their assessment of the critical consensus.

Reviewing for the Chicago Tribune in May 2016, Greg Kot hailed the album as "a celebration of singing, harmonizing, human voices making a joyous noise together", while Kris Ex from Pitchfork named it "one of the strongest rap albums released this year, an uplifting mix of spiritual and grounded that even an atheist can catch the Spirit to". Writing for Vice, Robert Christgau believed Chance's already irrepressibly cheerful voice sounded more attractive and substantial than before because of how the music's gospel elements had encouraged a stronger "vocal muscle" and controlled pitch. Jon Caramanica of The New York Times argued that Chance had drawn on the spirituality and consciousness present in West's music while "blossoming into a crusader and a pop savant, coming as close as anyone has to eradicating the walls between the sacred and the secular". He found his flow melodically and rhythmically dense yet deft and effortless, while deeming his narratives both intimate and universal, touching on familial duties, the violent crime in Chance's native Chicago, and being an independent artist in the modern music industry era. In the opinion of Slate journalist Jack Hamilton, Coloring Book was "the first true gospel-rap masterpiece".

Accolades
At the end of 2016, Coloring Book appeared on a number of critics' lists ranking the year's top albums. According to Metacritic, it was the seventh most prominently ranked record of 2016. Christgau ranked it as the ninth best album of the year in his ballot for The Village Voices annual Pazz & Jop critics poll. The album won Best Rap Album at the 2017 Grammy Awards. It was the first streaming-only album to win a Grammy.

Track listing
Credits are adapted from the album's vinyl liner notes.

Samples
 "All We Got" contains interpolations from "Good Ass Intro", written by  J. Bennett, Kanye West, Bryan J. Sledge, Lili K, Kiara Lanier, Peter CottonTale, Will Miller, J.P. Floyd, Cameron Osteen, Stefan Ponce, Lonnie Lynn and Dewayne Julius Rogers Sr.
  "Summer Friends" contains a sample from "Friends", written by Rostam Batmanglij, Justin Vernon, BJ Burton, Francis Farewell Starlite, Aaron Lammer, Ariel Rechtshaid, Benny Blanco and Cashmere Cat.
  "Juke Jam" contains samples of "Adriatic", performed by Mount Kimbie.
 "All Night" contains a sample of "Dealer's Corner", performed by Sven Torstenson.
  "How Great" contains an interpolation from "How Great Is Our God", written by Jesse Reeves, Ed Cash and Chris Tomlin.
 "Blessings" (reprise) contains a sample from "Let the Praise Begin (Chapter II)", performed by Fred Hammond.

Personnel
Vocalists

 Chance the Rapper – lead vocals , background vocals , vocals 
 Kanye West – featured vocals 
 Chicago Children's Choir – featured vocals , background vocals 
 Lil Wayne – featured vocals 
 2 Chainz – featured vocals 
 Jeremih – featured vocals 
 Francis and the Lights – featured vocals 
 DRAM – featured vocals , background vocals 
 Jamila Woods – featured vocals , background vocals 
 Young Thug – featured vocals 
 Lil Yachty – featured vocals 
 Saba – featured vocals 
 Justin Bieber – featured vocals 
 Towkio – featured vocals 
 Knox Fortune – featured vocals 
 Jay Electronica – featured vocals 
 My cousin Nicole – featured vocals 
 Future – featured vocals 
 T-Pain – featured vocals 
 Kirk Franklin – featured vocals , background vocals 
 Noname – featured vocals 
 Eryn Allen Kane – featured vocals , vocals 
 Ty Dolla Sign – featured vocals 
 Raury – featured vocals 
 BJ the Chicago Kid – featured vocals 
 Anderson .Paak – featured vocals 
 Grace Weber – vocals 
 Fred Hammond – vocals 
 Sima Cunningham – background vocals 
 Vasil Garnanliever – background vocals 
 Teddy Jackson – background vocals 
 Josephine Lee – background vocals 
 Jack Red – background vocals 
 Isaiah Robinson – background vocals 
 Jaime Woods – background vocals 
 Lakeitsha Williams – background vocals 
 Rachel Cato – background vocals 
 Jordan Ware – background vocals 
 Elle Varner – background vocals 
 Karl Rubin – background vocals 
 Macie Stewart – background vocals 
 Nicole Steen – background vocals 
 Kirk Franklin's choir – background vocals 

Instrumentalists

 Nico Segal – trumpet 
 J.P. Floyd – horns 
 Rajiv Halim – saxophones 
 Greg Landfair Sr. – guitar 

Additional side artists

 Ha Ha Davis 
 James Francies 
 Ashwin Torke 
 Zarif Wilder 
 Mitchell Owens 
 Eric Pidluski 
 Brian Beach 
 Bridget Andes 
 Scott Dickinson 
 Meena Cho 
 Ashley Simpson 
 Benjamin Shepherd 
 Joseph Lopez 

Technical

 Nate Fox – recording , mixing 
 Squirrel – engineering 
 Rian – engineering 
 Jeff Lane – mixing 
 Elton "L10MixedIt" Cheung – mixing 
 Peter CottonTale – mixing 
 Dave Kutch – mastering

Artwork

 O.J. Hays – design
 Brandon Breaux – cover artwork

Charts

Weekly charts

Year-end charts

Certifications

Notes

References

External links
 chanceraps.com
 Coloring Book

2016 mixtape albums
Chance the Rapper albums
Self-released albums
Grammy Award for Best Rap Album
Albums produced by Kanye West
Albums produced by Kaytranada
Christian hip hop albums